The palazzo Doria-Tursi or palazzo Niccolò Grimaldi is a building on Via Giuseppe Garibaldi in the historic town centre of Genoa. With Palazzo Rosso and Palazzo Bianco it houses the Strada Nuova Museums and on 13 July 2006 all three palaces and the streets around them became the Genoa: Le Strade Nuove and the system of the Palazzi dei Rolli World Heritage Site. Since 1848 Palazzo Doria-Tursi has also housed the city hall of Genoa.

History 

The largest palazzo on the street and the only one built on three lots of land, it was begun in 1565 by the Mannerist architects Domenico and Giovanni Ponzello, pupils of  Galeazzo Alessi, for Niccolò Grimaldi, known as "il Monarca" for his huge number of noble titles and for being main banker to Philip II of Spain. It had two large gardens to frame the central building. The large loggias facing the street were added in 1597, when the palazzo was acquired by Giovanni Andrea Doria for his younger son Carlo, Duke of Tursi, giving the building its present name.

Following the Kingdom of Sardinia's annexation of the Republic of Genoa, the building was acquired by Victor Emmanuel I of Sardinia in 1820, at which point it was rebuilt by the Savoy court architect Carlo Randoni, adding the clock-tower. From 1848 it

Architecture

Exterior

Interior

Gallery

Museum rooms

References

Bibliography 
  Massimo Listri, I musei di strada nuova a Genova, Allemandi, 2005, .

External links 
 

Art museums and galleries in Genoa
Buildings and structures in Genoa
Buildings and structures completed in 1565
Buildings and structures completed in 1597
Mannerist architecture in Italy
Palazzi dei Rolli